Rosebud Summit is a  peak that constitutes the northeasternmost point in the Rosebud Ridge of the White Mountains in central Alaska. The mountain is traversed by the trail of the annual Yukon Quest 1,000-mile sled dog race. It lends its name to nearby Rosebud Creek.

Notes 

Mountains of Fairbanks North Star Borough, Alaska
Mountains of Alaska
Landforms of Yukon–Koyukuk Census Area, Alaska
Yukon Quest
Mountains of Unorganized Borough, Alaska